Joseph Anton Rhomberg (24 September 1786, Dornbirn - 3 December 1853, Munich) was an Austrian-born German painter, illustrator and graphic artist.

Biography 
He was the youngest son of ten children, born to an entrepreneurial family, dealing in textiles, although they suffered financial hardships throughout much of his youth, and he received little education. His father, Johannes Rhomberg (1733–1795), worked as a local portrait painter, which inspired him to seek his career elsewhere.

In 1802, he began his art studies at the Academy of Fine Arts Vienna. He had his first exhibition there in 1814.

From 1817 to 1822, he lived in Vienna, painting portraits of prominent people. In 1823, he returned to Munich and, in 1827, became a Professor of drawing at the Technical University. His notable students there included , Gebhard Flatz, Theodor Horschelt, Friedrich Salzer and Alexander Strähuber. During this period, he specialized in religious art.

His son, also became a painter.

Sources 
 Josef Anton Rhomberg @ Deutsche Biographie
 
 Georg Kaspar Nagler: Neues allgemeines Künstler-Lexicon oder Nachrichten von dem Leben und den Werken der Maler, Bildhauer, Baumeister, Kupferstecher, Formschneider, Lithographen, Zeichner, Medailleure, Elfenbeinarbeiter, etc, 1843, Verlag Fleischmann (Online @ Google Books)

External links 

 More works by Rhomberg @ ArtNet
 

1786 births
1853 deaths
19th-century German painters
19th-century German male artists
German portrait painters
German illustrators
Academy of Fine Arts Vienna alumni
Academy of Fine Arts, Munich alumni
People from Dornbirn
Austrian emigrants to Germany